John Thomas Paice (4 December 1931 – 12 January 2015) was an Australian rules footballer who played with Carlton in the Victorian Football League (VFL).

Notes

External links 

John Paice's profile at Blueseum

1931 births
2015 deaths
Carlton Football Club players
Australian rules footballers from Victoria (Australia)